James Dale (born August 2, 1970) is an American gay rights activist. He is best known for his role in Boy Scouts of America v. Dale, the landmark US Supreme Court case that challenged the Boy Scouts of America (BSA) policy of excluding homosexuals from being scout leaders.

Before the case
James Dale joined the Scouting program at the age of 8 years old, beginning with Pack 242 in Monmouth County, New Jersey. Over the years Dale engaged with a number of different troops and rose through the various levels of Scouting.  In Troop 128, he became a protégé of M. Norman Powell, a descendant of Lord Baden-Powell (founder of the international Scouting movement).  It was Powell who presented Dale with his Eagle Scout Award in the fall of 1988.

While a student at Rutgers University, Dale became co-president of the Lesbian, Gay and Bisexual Alliance. In July 1990, he was a featured speaker at a Rutgers School of Social Work conference on the health needs of lesbian and gay teenagers and was interviewed by the Newark Star Ledger. In the interview, Dale was quoted as stating that he was gay. After the interview appeared, BSA officials expelled Dale, then 19 years old, from his position as assistant Scoutmaster for Troop 73. "The grounds for this membership revocation are the standards for leadership established by the Boy Scouts of America, which specifically forbid membership to homosexuals."

Dale filed suit in the New Jersey Superior Court, alleging that the Boy Scouts had violated the state statute prohibiting discrimination on the basis of sexual orientation in places of public accommodation. In 1995 Superior Court Judge Patrick J. McGann ruled with the BSA labeling Dale an "active sodomite."  In 1998 the Superior Court decision was overturned on appeal.

In a unanimous decision, the Supreme Court of New Jersey sided with Dale, asserting that his expulsion from the BSA violated the law. The Boy Scouts appealed to the Supreme Court of the United States, which granted certiorari.

BSA v. Dale
Boy Scouts of America et al v. Dale  was heard by the Supreme Court on April 26, 2000, and the decision was announced on June 28. In a 5–4 decision, the Court sided with the BSA and overturned the New Jersey Supreme Court's decision.

The majority opinion held that the First Amendment right to freedom of "expressive association" allows a private organization like the BSA to exclude members who they feel would express a viewpoint that is contrary to the organization's mission. The Scout Oath and Scout Law set forth central tenets, including that a Scout must be "clean" and "morally straight". The BSA maintained that homosexuality was unclean and immoral, and therefore the presence of an openly gay scout would be contrary to the group's cause.

In their dissenting opinion, the minority held that the ban on gay Scouts did not follow from its founding principles, and Scout Law says nothing on matters of sexuality. They noted that Scout policy discourages Scoutmasters to engage in any discussion of sexual issues, so it should make no difference what that Scoutmaster's sexual orientation might be, and society's longstanding history of prejudice against gays and lesbians would be aggravated by the "creation of a constitutional shield".

Post decision
In 2001, he appeared in the documentary Scout's Honor and relayed his experience with the scouts and his court case.

In 2012, the BSA reaffirmed their ban on gays from membership in the organization.

Dale continues to maintain that the BSA policy on gays is a question of civil rights on which there can be no compromise: "In order for scouting to regain its relevancy and be on the right side of history, there can be no halfway".

On May 23, 2013, the BSA's National Council approved a resolution to remove the restriction denying membership to youth on the basis of sexual orientation alone effective January 1, 2014. The ban on gay adult scout leaders remained in effect. On May 21, 2015, BSA National President Robert Gates stated that the "status quo [ban on gay adult leaders] in [the BSA] movement's membership standards cannot be sustained" and that he would no longer seek to revoke the charters of chapters that accept gay adult leaders.

References

1970 births
Living people
Gay men
LGBT people from New Jersey
American LGBT rights activists
People from Middletown Township, New Jersey
Rutgers University alumni